NFD may refer to:

 Nephrogenic fibrosing dermopathy, a medical condition
 Newfoundland dollar, the currency of the Dominion of Newfoundland from 1865 to 1949.
 Nifedipine
 Northfield railway station, England (National Rail code: NFD)
 Northern Frontier District, Kenya
 Normalization Form Canonical Decomposition, one of the forms of Unicode normalization
 Nürnberger Flugdienst, one of the regional airlines that merged to form Eurowings